The SP-62 is a highway in the southeastern part of the state of São Paulo in Brazil.  The highway is begins in the District of Eugenio de Mello and shares the route with  SP-123 for a few kilometres and ends in Cachoeira Paulista.

Highway sections
Edmir Viana Moura, Mayor: Distrito Eugenio de Mello - Caçapava
Vito Ardito De - até: Caçapava - SP-123
Emilio Amadei Beringhs: SP-123 - Taubaté
Amador Bueno da Veiga: Taubaté - Pindamonhangaba
Abel Fabricio Dias, Vereador: Pindamonhangaba - Roseira
Marieta Vilela da Costa Braga: Roseira - Aparecida
Padroeira do Brasil: Aparecida - Guaratinguetá
Aristeu Vieira Vilela, Mayor: Guaratinguetá - Lorena
Oswaldo Ortiz Monteiro, Deputy: Lorena - Cachoeira Paulista

References

59
Highways in São Paulo (state)